Michael P. Zuckert (born July 24, 1942) is an American political philosopher and Reeves Dreux Professor of Political Science at the University of Notre Dame. Zuckert earned a bachelor's degree in Cornell University in 1964, and completed his master's degree and doctorate at the University of Chicago in 1967 and 1974, respectively.

Books
Launching Liberalism: John Locke and the Liberal Tradition (University of Kansas Press, 2002) 
The Natural Rights Republic (University of Notre Dame Press)
Natural Rights and the New Republicanism (Princeton University Press, 1994)
The Truth about Leo Strauss (2006) with Catherine Zuckert, University of Chicago Press
Leo Strauss and the Problem of Political Philosophy (2014) with Catherine Zuckert, University of Chicago Press
The Spirit of Religion and the Spirit of Liberty (University of Chicago Press, 2017)
Lincoln and Democratic Statesmanship (University Press of Kansas, 2020)
A Nation So Conceived:  Abraham Lincoln and the Paradox of Democratic Sovereignty (University Press of Kansas, 2022)

References

External links
 Michael Zuckert

Further reading
Natural Right and Political Philosophy: Essays in Honor of Catherine and Michael Zuckert. Edited by Lee Ward and Ann Ward. South Bend, IN: University of Notre Dame Press, 2013.

21st-century American philosophers
Philosophy academics
University of Notre Dame faculty
Living people
1942 births
Political philosophers
Political science journal editors
University of Chicago alumni
Political scientists who studied under Leo Strauss
Cornell University alumni
American political scientists